Login allows access to a computer system through providing private credentials, such as a username and a password.

Login may also refer to:

People
 John Spencer Login (1809–1863), a Scottish surgeon in British India
 Lena Login (born Lena Campbell, 1820–1904), a Scottish author and wife of John Spencer 
 Samo and Iza Login, founders of Outfit7
 Thomas Login (1823–1874), a Scottish civil engineer
 Login Geiden (Lodewijk van Heiden, 1772–1850), a Dutch admiral

Other uses
 Login, Carmarthenshire, a hamlet in Wales
 Login Halt railway station on the Whitland and Cardigan Railway
 Login (film), a 2012 Hindi film
 ;login:, a technical journal

See also 
 
 Lockin (disambiguation)
 Log (disambiguation)
 Log file, a file that records events in an operating system
 Logging, the cutting and processing of trees
 Loggins, a surname
 Sam Loggin (born 1977), English actress